Sofia University St. Kliment Ohridski Metro Station is a station on the Sofia Metro in Bulgaria. It was introduced into service on September 7, 2009. On 26 August 2020, transfer to Orlov Most on M3 line was opened.

Public Transportation
West side:
 Trolleybus service: 1, 2, 4, 11
 City Bus service: 9, 84, 94, 280, 306
East side:
 Trolleybus service: 4, 5, 8, 11
 City Bus service: 9, 72, 75, 76, 84, 94, 204, 213, 214, 280, 304, 306, 505, 604

Location
The Sofia University St. Kliment Ohridski Metro Station is located on the intersection of Vasil Levski Boulevard and Tsar Osvoboditel Boulevard next to the Sofia University, the central park Borisova gradina and National Assembly of Bulgaria in the center of the city.

Gallery

References

External links

 Sofia Metropolitan
 Unofficial site

Sofia Metro stations
Railway stations opened in 2009
2009 establishments in Bulgaria